Alex Polisois (born January 19, 1957) is a Canadian table tennis player.

References
 

1957 births
Living people
Canadian male table tennis players
Pan American Games medalists in table tennis
Pan American Games gold medalists for Canada
Pan American Games bronze medalists for Canada
Place of birth missing (living people)
Table tennis players at the 1979 Pan American Games
Medalists at the 1979 Pan American Games